Downsizing is a 2017 American science fiction comedy-drama film directed by Alexander Payne, written by Payne and Jim Taylor, and starring Matt Damon, Christoph Waltz, Hong Chau, and Kristen Wiig. It tells the story of Paul Safrânek, who decides to undergo a recently invented procedure to shrink his body so he can start a new life in an experimental community, which he ends up doing alone when his wife backs out at the last minute; his journey takes an unexpected turn after he befriends an impoverished activist. Principal photography for the film began in Ontario, Canada, on April 1, 2016.

The film premiered at the 74th Venice International Film Festival on August 30, 2017, and was theatrically released in the United States by Paramount Pictures on December 22, 2017. It was a box-office bomb, grossing only $55 million against a production budget of $68–76 million, and received mixed reviews from critics. Nevertheless, it was chosen by the National Board of Review as one of the top ten films of 2017, while Chau earned a nomination for Best Supporting Actress at the 75th Golden Globe Awards.

Plot
Searching for a way to address overpopulation and global warming, Norwegian scientist Dr. Jørgen Asbjørnsen develops "downsizing", an irreversible process that shrinks organic material. He becomes part of the first group of human test subjects and is encouraged that the process reduces people to a height of approximately five inches, drastically decreasing their consumption and waste. When the findings are revealed at a conference five years later, there is a global sensation.

Ten years later, Paul and Audrey Safrânek, a financially-struggling married couple in Omaha, see Dave and Carol Johnson, who have downsized, at Paul's high school reunion. Rather than the touted environmental benefits, Dave argues the real reason to downsize is that one's money goes much further when one is small. Paul and Audrey decide to undergo the procedure and move to Leisureland, New Mexico, one of the fancier communities for small individuals. In a recovery room in Leisureland, Paul receives a call from Audrey, who says she decided to not go through with their plan and, because they are now different sizes, she is leaving him.

One year later, Paul signs his divorce papers. He has moved into an apartment, since he can no longer afford to live in the mansion Audrey picked, and is working as a customer service representative for Lands' End, since he let his occupational therapy license lapse because he had not expected to have to work after being shrunk, but has started dating someone. They break up, however, and Paul attends a wild party hosted by his shady but affable neighbor Dušan.

The next morning, Paul recognizes one of Dušan's house cleaners as Ngoc Lan Tran, a Vietnamese political activist who was jailed and downsized against her will, escaped in a television box, barely survived being shipped to the United States, and was brought to Leisureland a year ago to have her leg amputated. Wanting to assist Ngoc Lan with her prosthetic leg, Paul goes to her apartment in the slums just outside the walls of Leisureland where the service workers of the community live. Paul had not thought about this part of the small economy, and is shocked by conditions in the slum.

At her apartment, Ngoc Lan has Paul try to help her dying friend. When she finally lets him work on her prosthetic leg, he breaks it, so, until she can get a new one, he agrees to work for her cleaning service and also help her gather food from around the city to distribute throughout the slums. Dušan, upon learning what Paul is doing, attempts to release Paul from his obligation by taking him to deliver supplies to the original colony for small people, but, unexpectedly, Ngoc Lan decides to tag along, as she has a standing invitation to visit Dr. Asbjørnsen, who had heard about her ordeal.

In a Norwegian fjord, Dr. Asbjørnsen and his wife board the boat piloted by Dušan's friend Joris Konrad. Dr. Asbjørnsen announces it has just been determined conclusively that, due to the positive feedback of Arctic methane emissions, the human race will soon become extinct. Paul asks if downsizing can save humanity, but Dr. Asbjørnsen says the procedure came too late, as only three percent of the world has so far chosen to downsize. That night, Paul and Ngoc Lan make love.

At the colony, the travelers discover that, the next day, Dr. Asbjørnsen is enacting a contingency plan: he and the other colonists are going to enter a large underground vault, and their descendants will emerge when the surface environment stabilizes in about eight thousand years. Dušan and Joris are skeptical of the cult-like plan and say the extinction will not happen for hundreds of years, while Paul is excited to enter the vault and help with this effort to ensure the future of mankind. He asks Ngoc Lan to join him, but she refuses, saying the people in need of help will be those left above ground. As the door of the vault is closing, Paul changes his mind and steps outside.

Back in Leisureland, Paul continues to work with Ngoc Lan to serve the people of the slums, deriving contentment from things like bringing dinner to an old man.

Cast
 Matt Damon as Paul Safrânek, an occupational therapist who signs up for the "downsizing" program
 Christoph Waltz as Dušan Mirković, an aging Serbian playboy and profiteer
 Hong Chau as Ngoc Lan Tran, a Vietnamese activist who was shrunk by her government against her will and befriends Paul after she winds up in Leisureland
 Kristen Wiig as Audrey Safrânek, Paul's wife, who divorces him after she decides not to complete the "downsizing" procedure
 Rolf Lassgård as Dr. Jørgen Asbjørnsen, the inventor of the "downsizing" procedure
 Ingjerd Egeberg as Anne-Helene Asbjørnsen, Jørgen Asbjørnsen's wife
 Udo Kier as Joris Konrad, Dušan's friend
 Søren Pilmark as Dr. Andreas Jacobsen, the lead scientist at the Edvardsen Institute
 Jason Sudeikis as Dave Johnson, Paul's childhood friend, who encourages Paul to "downsize"
 Maribeth Monroe as Carol Johnson, Dave Johnson's wife
 Margareta Pettersson as Solveig Edvardsen, an eccentric elder at the original colony for the small

There are numerous cameos in the film, among them: Joaquim de Almeida as Conference Director Dr. Oswaldo Pereira; James Van Der Beek as Anesthesiologist, a former-classmate of Paul's who he talks to at their high school reunion; Neil Patrick Harris and Laura Dern as Jeff and Laura Lonowski, a small couple who gives a sales presentation for Leisureland; Niecy Nash as Leisureland Salesperson; Margo Martindale as a small woman on a shuttle bus; Donna Lynne Champlin as Leisureland Administrator; Don Lake as Leisureland Guide Matt; and Kerri Kenney-Silver as Single Mom Kristen, who Paul dates after his divorce.

Production
During the seven-year hiatus between the releases of their collaborations Sideways (2004) and The Descendants (2011), Alexander Payne and Jim Taylor spent two and a half years working on the script for Downsizing, which was going to be Payne's next film after Sideways until it was superseded by The Descendants and then Nebraska (2013). On November 5, 2014, it was officially announced that Downsizing would be Payne's follow-up to Nebraska.

Payne, Taylor, and Mark Johnson produced the film, whose script was co-written by Payne and Taylor. On January 8, 2015, it was announced that Annapurna Pictures would finance and produce the film; Ad Hominem Enterprises, Payne and Taylor's production company, was also involved with the production. 20th Century Fox was originally going to distribute the film, but it was revealed on October 2, 2015, that Paramount Pictures had acquired distribution rights.

Reese Witherspoon was attached to the project in 2009, at which point Paul Giamatti and Sacha Baron Cohen were also set to star. On November 5, 2014, Matt Damon was officially cast in the film, taking over Giamatti's role. On January 7, 2015, it was confirmed that Witherspoon was still participating in the project, which would have been her first collaboration with Payne since Election (1999). The next day, it was announced that Alec Baldwin, Neil Patrick Harris, and Jason Sudeikis had joined the cast, though Baldwin later dropped out. On March 10, 2016, Christoph Waltz and Hong Chau joined the film, and on March 29, it was revealed that Kristen Wiig had replaced Witherspoon as Damon's character's wife. In August 2016, it was announced that Margo Martindale had been cast in a minor role.

Principal photography for the film began on April 1, 2016, in Mississauga and Toronto, Ontario, Canada, at York University’s Vari Hall, University of Toronto Mississauga and the Aga Khan Museum. Filming later took place in Markham, Omaha, Los Angeles, and Trollfjorden in Norway. Rolfe Kent composed the score for the film.

Release
Downsizing premiered at the 74th Venice Film Festival on August 30, 2017, and later screened at the 2017 Toronto International Film Festival. It was theatrically released in the United States on December 22, 2017, by Paramount Pictures.

In the United States and Canada, Downsizing was released alongside Father Figures and Pitch Perfect 3, as well as the wide expansions of The Shape of Water and Darkest Hour, and was projected to gross $10–12 million from 2,668 theaters over its four-day opening weekend. It made $2.1 million on its first day (including $425,000 from Thursday night previews) and grossed $4.95 million over its three-day opening weekend, finishing 7th at the box office. This marked the third recent domestic financial failure for Paramount Pictures, following Mother! and Suburbicon, the latter of which also starred Matt Damon. The following weekend, the film dropped 5% to $4.7 million, finishing 9th.

The film grossed $24.4 million in the United States and Canada, and $30.6 million in other territories, for a total of $55 million, against a production budget of around $68 million.

Home video
The film was released on Digital HD on March 6, 2018, and on Ultra HD Blu-ray, Blu-ray, and DVD on March 20.

Reception
On review aggregator website Rotten Tomatoes, the film has an approval rating of 47% based on 301 reviews, with an average rating of 5.70/10; the website's critical consensus reads: "Downsizing assembles a talented cast in pursuit of some truly interesting ideaswhich may be enough for some audiences to forgive the final product's frustrating shortcomings." On Metacritic, the film has a weighted average score of 63 out of 100, based on 48 critics, indicating "generally favorable reviews". Audiences polled by CinemaScore gave the film an average grade of "C" on an A+ to F scale.

Todd McCarthy of The Hollywood Reporter, who eventually named the film his best of 2017, praised it as "big and beautiful", highlighting the direction and the lead performances, and saying "this is a deeply humane film that, like the best Hollywood classics, feels both entirely of its moment and timeless. It was a risky roll of the dice, but one that hits the creative jackpot." Xan Brooks of The Guardian gave Downsizing five out of five stars, calling the film "Alexander Payne's miniature masterpiece". Writing for Rolling Stone, Peter Travers gave the film 3.5 out of 4 stars, saying that "with startling performances and special effects, director Alexander Payne's dystopian sci-fi satire brims over with the pleasures of the unexpected."

Conversely, David Sims of The Atlantic gave the film a negative review, writing: "If Payne had landed the mix of genres, Downsizing could have been a masterpiece. Spoiler (small print not required): He does not." Keith Uhlich of Slant Magazine gave the film 1.5 out of 4 stars and said: "Payne [...] appears to think he's making some kind of grand statement. So you just sit back and marvel at how his reach continually exceeds his grasp." Richard Brody of The New Yorker described Downsizing as "three movies in onea passable one, a terrific one, and a terrible one. They're unified in the realization of the movie's big idea, but the movie's straining after a big idea is its overarching weakness."

Accolades

See also
List of films featuring miniature people

Notes

References

External links
 
 
 

2017 films
2010s science fiction comedy films
American science fiction comedy films
2010s English-language films
Films about size change
Films about amputees
Films about divorce
Overpopulation fiction
Films set in the future
Films directed by Alexander Payne
Films set in Norway
Films set in Istanbul
Films set in Nebraska
Films shot in California
Films shot in Los Angeles
Films shot in Nebraska
Films shot in Norway
Films shot in Toronto
Paramount Pictures films
Films with screenplays by Alexander Payne
Films with screenplays by Jim Taylor (writer)
Films scored by Rolfe Kent
2017 comedy films
Films set in New Mexico
Climate change films
2010s American films